Camanche Township is a township in Clinton County, Iowa, USA.  As of the 2000 census, its population was 4,368.

History
Camanche Township was founded in 1841.

Geography
According to the USGS, it contains two cemeteries: Rose Hill and Shaffton.

Nancy Elaine Lake and Willow Lake are within this township. The streams of Beaver Slough, Rock Creek, Schricker Slough and Sodus Creek run through this township.

Notes

References
 USGS Geographic Names Information System (GNIS)

External links
 US-Counties.com
 City-Data.com

Townships in Clinton County, Iowa
Townships in Iowa
1841 establishments in Iowa Territory